The Santal or Santhal are an Austroasiatic speaking  
Munda ethnic group in South Asia. Santals are the largest tribe in the Jharkhand and West Bengal state of India in terms of population and are also found in the states of Odisha, Bihar and Assam. They are the largest ethnic minority in northern Bangladesh's Rajshahi Division and Rangpur Division. They have a sizeable population in Nepal. The Santals speak Santali, the most widely spoken Munda languages of Austro-asiatic language family.

Etymology 
Santal is most likely derived from an exonym. The sanskrit word Samant or Bengali Saont means plain land.

History

Origins 
According to linguist Paul Sidwell, Austro-Asiatic language speakers probably arrived on coast of Odisha from Indochina about 4,000–3,500 years ago. The Austroasiatic speakers spread from Southeast Asia and mixed extensively with local Indian populations. After arriving in India, Munda peoples extensively mixed with Dravidian tribal groups.

Due to the lack of significant archaeological records, the original homeland of the Santals is not known with certainty. From there, they claim, they were pushed onto Chota Nagpur Plateau, then to Jhalda, Patkum and finally Saont, where they settled for good. According to Dalton, where they were renamed to Santal from cluster name Kharwar. This legend, which has been cited by several scholars, has been used as evidence that the Santals once had a significant presence in Hazaribagh. Colonial scholar Colonel Dalton claimed in Chai there was a fort formerly occupied by a Santal raja who was forced to flee when the Delhi Sultanate invaded the territory.

British period 

In the latter half of the 18th century, the Santals entered the historical record in 1795 when they are recorded as "Soontars." During the Bengal Famine of 1770, the drier western and southwestern parts of Bengal, especially the Jungle Mahals region, were some of the worst-hit areas and were significantly depopulated. This depopulation resulted in a significant loss of revenue for the East India Company. Therefore, when the Permanent Settlement was enacted in 1790, the Company looked for agriculturalists to clear the lands. British officials turned their attention to Santals, who  were ready to clear the forest for the practice of settled agriculture. In 1832, a large number of area of the Raj Mahal hills demarcated as Damin-i-koh. Santal from Cuttack, Dhalbhum, Birbhum, Manbhum, Hazaribagh migrated and started cultivating these lands as peasants  sponsored by landowners and the British who were desperate for labour. Under British direction, Santals took loans from non-Santal moneylenders to buy iron tools, seed grain and oxen as individuals and families, rather than groups as was their custom for working the land.

When they arrived in Damin-i-koh (present day Santal Pargana), the British provided no protection for the Santals against the preexisting Mal Paharias, who were against destruction of forest, were known raiders of the plains areas and had only recently been partially "pacified". Eventually, the Santals, with their better technology and ability to match the Paharia's guerrilla attacks, managed to drive them out. They clear the forest tracts and started cultivation in these areas. Their settlement took place between the 1830s and 1850s: in 1830, the area was home to only 3,000 Santals, but by the 1850s, 83,000 Santals had settled in the land and had turned it into paddy fields. This resulted in a 22 times increase in Company revenue from the area.

However, as they became more agricultural, the Santals were exploited by the zamindars. Unlike the Santals, the British valued individual competition instead of cooperation, and had a rigid system of laws very different from the relatively relaxed norms of the village council, the highest form of government most Santals knew. Mahajans from Bengal and Baniyas from Bihar began selling goods from elsewhere, and many Santals, seeing them as exotic, were tricked into debt to buy them, usually with a mortgage on their land. When the Santals were unable to pay the moneylenders back, they became owners of the land and the Santals became dispossessed landless peasants. The Baniya merchants and other outsiders also began to treat Santals as outcastes in a  Brahminical system.

Eventually, these acts of exploitation, combined with British tax policies and corrupt tax collectors, deteriorated to the point where Santals grew discontented. Eventually, around 10,000 British troops managed to suppress the rebellion. Although the rebellion's impact was largely overshadowed by that of the Indian Rebellion of 1857, the impact of the Santhal Rebellion lives on as a turning point in Santhal pride and identity. This was reaffirmed, over a century and a half later with the creation of the  tribal province in the Republic of India, Jharkhand. Following the rebellion, the British satisfied all Santhal demands, due to their importance as a tax-paying group. The British created a 5000 km2 area, called Santal Parganas, where the normal procedures of British India did not apply. Administration of the community was primarily made the responsibility of the village headman, or pradhan, who was also given the power to collect taxes. It was made illegal for Santals to transfer land to non-Santals, allowing them to have legal rights over their land.

After the British government formally took control over India in 1858, the Santals continued their system of government and traditions. Newly established Christian missions brought  education, and many Santals moved to the tea plantations in Assam, North Bengal, where they still remain today. However, most continued with their old life, but were still not prosperous. In addition, secular education did not become widespread until after Indian independence.

In the late 19th century, many Santals migrated from the Santal Parganas to the districts of Bihar and North Bengal such as Purnia, Malda and Dinajpur. The Santals still faced retaliation after the Santal Hul and were invited by zamindars to cultivate many parts of north Bengal, which had become scrubland, land which the Santals specialized in farming. By the 1930s, their numbers in this region the Santals had become two lakh. Most were settled on wasteland where the rent was cheaper than the more fertile wet lands. However they faced heavy taxation from the zamindars, and were oppressed by moneylenders, upper castes, and the bureaucracy in general. In 1924, several Santal sardars, influenced by Gandhian ideology and led by Jitu Sardar, began to lead agitations against the oppressive double system of elite Bengalis and British government. Santals stopped paying rent to the zamindars, beat up revenue inspectors, and led agitations against the moneylenders. In 1928, the Santals stopped paying the chaukidari tax and led protests in Thakurgaon in 1929. In 1932, several Santals attempted to organise their own state with Jitu Sardar as head, initially based on Gandhi's Ram Rajya but quickly criticised Gandhi when he did not help them. In 1933, a British commissioner was appointed to look into the grievances of Santals of North Bengal.

Post-independence 
The Santal community, like the others of the region, was split between West Bengal in India and East Bengal in Pakistan during Partition. After independence, the Santals were made one of the Scheduled Tribes in India. In East Pakistan, there were some regions in the west where Santals were still in significant numbers. There and in neighbouring West Bengal, the Santals provided significant support to the Tebhaga movement. After the Pakistani military crushed the uprising and burned many Santal homes, many fled across the border to Malda in India.

In northern West Bengal, tribal peasants participated in Naxalbari uprising led by a Santal communist leader Jangal Santhal. The impoverishment  has led to the Guevarist inspired Naxalite insurgency in what is often termed as the Red Corridor.

After Jharkhand was carved out of Bihar in 2000, the Santal Parganas was made a separate division of the state. These Santals have also agitated for recognition of their traditions in the census as a separate religion, sarna dharam, for which Jharkhand assembly passed a resolution in 2020. Many still face poverty and exploitation, and in Bangladesh, theft of their lands is common. Although spread out over a large area, they now consider the Santal Parganas as their cultural heartland.

Society 
The base of Santal society is a division between "brother" and "guest", a divide found in many other tribal societies of central and eastern India. Those in the closest form of brotherhood, called  ("people of one house") in Singhbhum, cannot marry each other and propitiate the same deity, since the house refers to a common ancestor from which all the families are believed to descend. Only  marriages are severely stigmatised. Another brotherhood is membership of a clan, which are exogamous. They also give help in times of hardship.

Members of other communities, especially those not speaking Santali, are excluded from this grouping, except for communities such as the Karmakar, Mahali or Lohar, who are enmeshed in Santal society. Those with this relationship can marry, and attend major festivals as guests. People related by marriage, although , have special roles in life-cycle events. Women perform special welcome rituals for  when they visit. Those related by marriage can have one of two relationships.

Santal society has much less stratification and is more egalitarian than adjacent caste Hindu society, but still has some status differences. This standing is evaluated by relation: for example, is someone is greeting their father's elder brother's son, they would be the junior irrespective of age. Similarly, when someone greets their elder brother's wife, the wife would be . The ritual greeting ( in Santali) of someone is given much importance and is done in the courtyard of a house when a  visits. The greeting differs by gender, and whether the person is junior or senior to the one being greeted. The greeting rituals given by a  involve an "offering" of respect, while a  "receives" this respect. This greeting should not be done hastily, and correct practice of it is encouraged in children from a young age.

These 12 clans are divided into two ranks: 7 senior and 5 junior. Members of a senior clan do not marry members of a junior clan, and there are some forbidden marriages as well, such as between Marndi and Kisku. In addition, Besras are sometimes treated differently due to their perceived low status, but other than the context of marriage, they play no role in social life. The clans also avoid harming their clan totem, lest evil befall them.

The term refers to descendants of a common ancestor, no more than a few generations back, that live nearby. In many cases, all the people of a  live in their ancestral village, but some members may have migrated to neighbouring villages.

Culture

Festivals 
Sohrai is the principal festival of Santal community. Besides that Baha, Karam, Dashain, Sakrat, Mahmore, Rundo and Magsim are important festivals. They traditionally accompany many of their dances during these festivals with two drums: the Tamak‘ and the Tumdak’.

Chadar Badar, a form of puppetry known also as Santal puppetry, is a folk show involving wooden puppets placed in a small cage which acts as the stage.

The walls of traditional Santal homes are ornamented with carved designs of animals, hunting scenes, dancing scenes, and geometric patterns. Santal bridal palanquins are also finely carved.

Marriage 
There are seven kinds of marriage recognized in the Santal community, each with its own degree of social acceptance. In this form of marriage, a boy and girl who wish to marry decide to go to the groom's house and stay there a while. The bride and groom are not bound by any obligation to marry. During this time, the  stays in the village to give all the information he can to the bride's father: both in determining what would be a good bride price to demand and whether the marriage might end in a short time.

Meanwhile, the groom's family gathers to discuss the bride price the groom's father should pay. The two parties then meet and the fathers negotiate the bride price to be paid. The groom is first asked whether he wishes the marriage to continue. As a symbolic marriage contract, the groom's father gives a small amount of cash and gives  (rice-beer) to the guests. The negotiations for bride-price continue between the fathers exclusively until an amount is reached. Although this is nowadays in cash, livestock or other goods are not uncommon. The bride price is generally light and it is seen wrong to stop two young people from marrying because of a disagreement about bride price. After an agreement is reached, celebrations ensue and festive drinking continues into the night.

Afterwards the couple arrive in the bride's natal village. The bride arriving first carrying a pot with white clay, the symbol of a woman returning to her natal village as a guest. When the couple leaves the bride's village, the bride pays her respects to the headman in his courtyard. The headman then blesses the couple and wishes the bride strength, good luck and many strong sons. The couple then leaves for the groom's village to start their new life.

Marriages done by  involve very little ritual: Santal society has clearly defined roles for marriage, and the choice of the couple is respected. Decisions by the families are done in a spirit of consensus rather than adversarially, and marriage is seen just as important for the entire village as for the couple.

Religion 

In the Santal religion, the majority of reverence falls on a court of spirits, who handle different aspects of the world and who are placated with prayers and offerings. These benevolent spirits operate at the village, household, ancestor, and sub-clan level, along with evil spirits that cause disease and can inhabit village boundaries, mountains, water, tigers, and the forest.

There are several ranks of : the most important are associated intimately with Marang Buru and are worshipped by all Santals. Other , who are held to be less powerful, are the spirits of important people of the village who have since been deified. There is also another class of  who are feared as bringers of evil. These spirits are not placated by a priest but by a medicine-man called . In the present-day, belief in these malignant  is eroding due to the penetration of modern medical science. The lack of a separate name for malignant  caused many early colonial scholars to present Santal religion as wholly focused on the appeasement of evil spirits or as representing bongas as exclusively harmful. However  in itself simply means a supernatural force in the world and has no specific connotation with good or evil. Moreover, these bongas do not refer to specific objects but to the invisible force that governs or is associated with those objects.

The Santal creation story holds that originally the world was water, and Marang Buru and some lesser deities were the only inhabitants. When some spirits requested permission to make humans, Marang Buru asked  to create the human bodies. When she had finally succeeded, she was told by Marang Buru to use the human spirits that were high on the rafters of his hut. She could not reach the human spirit, and took the bird spirit instead. When Marang Buru integrated the spirits with the bodies, they flew away and asked for a place to build a nest. Marang Buru could not get anyone else to bring land to the surface, and so the tortoise volunteered and pushed the Earth onto his back. These two had seven sons and seven daughters, but the couple soon had a quarrel and separated. Pilchu Haram and his sons became great hunters, and on a time came upon the daughters, who had become maidens and were unrecognisable. They became introduced and made love. Looking for his sons, Pilchu Haram discovered an old woman and asked for fire, and upon talking to her more, he discovered his wife and reconciled with her. Another version tells how Pilchu Budhi was in fact in tears at her daughters' disappearance, but Marang Buru reassured her that they were all safe and brought her to reconcile with her husband. When their sons found out they had married their sisters, they were very angry and would have killed their parents if Marang Buru had not hidden them in a cave, where they stayed for the rest of their days. The children of these seven couples became the progenitors of the Santal clans.

A characteristic feature of a Santal village is a sacred grove (known as the ) on the edge of the village where many spirits live and where a series of annual festivals take place. This grove is set aside in the founding of the village and left undisturbed except at times of festival. Inside is set a series of natural (uncut) stones which represent the bongas, but are not substitutes except during festival. The , a raised mound of earth covered with a thatched roof outside the headman's house, is where the Majhi's ancestors' spirits live. During the summer, a jug of water is placed there so the spirits can drink. Here the most important decisions of the village are made, including judgements.

A yearly round of rituals connected with the agricultural cycle, along with life-cycle rituals for birth, marriage and burial at death, involves petitions to the spirits and offerings that include the sacrifice of animals, usually birds. Religious leaders are male specialists in medical cures who practice divination and witchcraft (the socio-historic meaning of the term, used here, refers to the ritual practice of magic and is not pejorative). Similar beliefs are common among other tribes on the Chota Nagpur Plateau like the Kharia, Munda, and Oraon.

Smaller and more isolated tribes often demonstrate less articulated classification systems of the spiritual hierarchy described as animism or a generalised worship of spiritual energies connected with locations, activities, and social groups. Religious concepts are intricately entwined with ideas about nature and interaction with local ecological systems. As in Santal religion, religious specialists are drawn from the village or family and serve a wide range of spiritual functions that focus on placating potentially dangerous spirits and co-ordinating rituals. These rituals include animal sacrifice, including cows, very unlike Brahminical Hinduism.

According to the 2011 Indian Census, for combined Jharkhand, West Bengal, Odisha and Bihar, 63% recorded their religion as 'Hinduism', while 31% practice other religions and persuasions (mainly Sarna dharam), and 5% practice Christianity. Islam, Sikhism, Buddhism and Jainism are followed by less than 1% of the population.

Politics

Schedule Tribe status 

The Santhal people are constitutionally designated Schedule tribe status only in Bihar, Jharkhand, West Bengal, Odisha and Tripura state of India. And the remaining Santhal living in other administrative region, specifically North Eastern state, who migrated during British raj to work as Assam tea garden laborer are not listed as Scheduled Tribes in these states. The inclusion in Schedule Tribe list have been opposed by tribal activists organization, like  Coordination Committee of Tribal Organizations of Assam (CCTOA). The organisation feared up that granting Scheduled Tribe status to the Santal and other 40 migrated tribal communities will squeeze up the benefits of  natives, the "original tribal people" of the state.

Religion status 

Santhal people believe in nature worship as well as sacrifices animals to their God and accept flesh as food, including beef,  which are generally not permitted in Hinduism. Thus they consider themselves believers Sarna religion rather than Hinduism. Although there is overlap of ideology, belief, culture and practices in between Sarnasim and Hinduism.

Notable people

Damayanti Beshra, writer
Shyam Sundar Besra, writer
Birbaha Hansda, Santali-language actress and politician
Rupchand Hansda, writer
Sukumar Hansda, Politician
Arjun Charan Hembram, writer
Deblina Hembram, politician
Purnima Hembram, Athlete
Sarojini Hembram, MP of Rajya Sabha from Odisha
Rathin Kisku, Baul singer.
Sarada Prasad Kisku, writer from Purulia
Babulal Marandi, first chief minister of Jharkhand
Louis Marandi, former cabinet minister of Jharkhand
Sudam Marndi, Revenue minister of Odisha
Sumitra Marandi, football player
Droupadi Murmu, 15th president of India, former governor of Jharkhand, former minister, Government of Odisha.
G. C. Murmu, 14th CAG of India and first lieutenant governor of J&K (union territory)
Joba Murmu, writer
Khagen Murmu an Indian politician and a Member of Parliament from Maldaha Uttar (Lok Sabha constituency).
Raghunath Murmu, Inventor of Ol Chiki script.
Sadhu Ramchand Murmu, Santali Poet, known as Kabiguru
Salkhan Murmu, Indian socio-political activist, former MP from Mayurbhanj
Sidhu and Kanhu Murmu, freedom fighters
Uma Saren, Politician, former MP from Jhargram
Hansda Sowvendra Shekhar, writer
Binita Soren, Indian mountaineer
Hemant Soren, Chief Minister of Jharkhand
Kherwal Soren, writer
Shibu Soren, former chief minister of Jharkhand and president of Jharkhand Mukti Morcha
Sita Soren, politician
Bishweswar Tudu, tribal affair minister of India
Jamuna Tudu, activist
Jabamani Tudu, football player
Majhi Ramdas Tudu, writer
Kunar Hembram, Member of Parliament

References

Bibliography

Notes 

 Bodding, P. O. Santal Folk Tales. Cambridge, Massachusetts: H. Aschehoug; Harvard University Press, 1925.
 Bodding, P. O. Santal Riddles and Witchcraft among the Santals. Oslo: A. W. Brøggers, 1940.
 Bodding, P. O. A Santal Dictionary (5 volumes), 1933–36 Oslo: J. Dybwad, 1929.
 Bodding, P. O. Materials for a Santali Grammar I, Dumka 1922
 Bodding, P. O. Studies in Santal Medicine and Connected Folklore (3 volumes), 1925–40
 Bompas, Cecil Henry, and Bodding, P. O. Folklore of the Santal Parganas. London: D. Nutt, 1909. Full text at Project Gutenberg.
 Chakrabarti, Dr. Byomkes, A Comparative Study of Santali and Bengali, KP Bagchi, Calcutta, 1994
 Culshaw, W. J. Tribal Heritage; a Study of the Santals. London: Lutterworth Press, 1949.
 Orans, Martin. "The Santal; a Tribe in Search of a Great Tradition." Based on thesis, University of Chicago., Wayne State University Press, 1965.
 Prasad, Onkar. Santal Music: A Study in Pattern and Process of Cultural Persistence, Tribal Studies of India Series; T 115. New Delhi: Inter-India Publications, 1985.
 Roy Chaudhury, Indu. Folk Tales of the Santals. 1st ed. Folk Tales of India Series, 13. New Delhi: Sterling Publishers, 1973.
 Troisi, J. The Santals: A Classified and Annotated Bibliography. New Delhi: Manohar Book Service, 1976.
 ———. Tribal Religion: Religious Beliefs and Practices among the Santals. New Delhi: Manohar, 2000.

External links 

 Saontal Voice in Bangladesh
 Santal Rebellion
 Santal Dance
 Boro Baski: Santal worries
 Santal culture on Daricha Foundation website (Kolkata)

 
Ethnic groups in Bangladesh
Indigenous peoples of South Asia
Linguistic groups of the constitutionally recognised official languages of India
Adivasi
Ethnic groups in Nepal
Social groups of Bihar
Social groups of Jharkhand
Social groups of Odisha
Social groups of West Bengal
Schools of Indian painting
Scheduled Tribes of Odisha